Scrobipalpa spergulariella is a moth in the family Gelechiidae. It was described by Pierre Chrétien in 1910. It is found in Tunisia, Spain, southern France, on Sicily, in Greece and on Crete.

The larvae feed on Spergularia azorica and Spergularia media.

References

Scrobipalpa
Moths described in 1910